Castro is a town and comune in the Italian province of Lecce in the Apulia region of south-eastern Italy.

History 
Its ancient temple of Minerva was said to have been founded by Idomeneus, who formed the tribe of the Sallentini from a mixture of Cretans, Illyrians and Italian Locrians (Central Greek tribe).

It is also said to have been the place where Aeneas first landed in Italy, the port of which he named Portus Veneris ("Port of Venus"). The temple had lost some of its importance in Strabo's day.

References

External links
 Castro Marina  
 Castro vacation rentals
 Castro vacation

Cities and towns in Apulia
Localities of Salento
Coastal towns in Apulia
Roman sites of Apulia